The men's 10,000 meter at the 2019 KNSB Dutch Single Distance Championships took place in Heerenveen at the Thialf ice skating rink on Sunday 30 December 2018. There were 10 participants.

Statistics

Result

Draw

Source:

Referee: D. Melis. Assistant: F. Zwitser  Starter: J. Rosing 
Start: 20:05 hr. Finish: 21:33 hr.

References

Single Distance Championships
2019 Single Distance